California's 52nd State Assembly district is one of 80 California State Assembly districts. It is currently represented by Democrat Wendy Carrillo.

District profile 
The district encompasses the extreme western parts of the Inland Empire, forming a major gateway between it and the San Gabriel Valley to the west. The district is mostly suburban and heavily Latino.

Los Angeles County – 1.5%
 Pomona

San Bernardino County – 15.5%
 Chino
 Montclair
 Ontario

Election results from statewide races

List of Assembly Members 
Due to redistricting, the 52nd district has been moved around different parts of the state. The current iteration resulted from the 2011 redistricting by the California Citizens Redistricting Commission.

Election results 1992 - present

2020

2018

2016

2014

2013 (special)

2012

2010

2008

2006

2004

2002

2000

1998

1996

1994

1992

See also 
 California State Assembly
 California State Assembly districts
 Districts in California

References

External links 
 District map from the California Citizens Redistricting Commission

52
Government of Los Angeles County, California
Government of San Bernardino County, California
Chino, California
Montclair, California
Ontario, California
Pomona, California
Pomona Valley
Inland Empire